The 1999 Sandwell Metropolitan Borough Council election took place on 6 May 1999 to elect members of Sandwell Metropolitan Borough Council in the West Midlands, England. One third of the council was up for election and the Labour party stayed in overall control of the council.

After the election, the composition of the council was
Labour 61
Liberal Democrat 9
Conservative 2

Campaign
Before the election Labour held 60 of the 72 seats on the council, with the Liberal Democrats the main opposition on the council. Labour were defending 19 seats, the Liberal Democrats 3 and the Conservatives 1 seat. The Conservative seat being defended in Wednesbury North was one of only 2 the party held, but both the Conservatives and Liberal Democrats planned to contest all 24 seats. The other seat being contested was in Tipton Green, where an independent Labour councillor stood down at the election. Candidates in the election included 2 from the British National Party and 1 from the National Front, meanwhile the Liberal Democrat candidate in Friar Park ward withdrew from the election.

During the election the Conservatives had an error on one of their leaflets with the phone number being for a Labour supporter.

Election result
The results saw Labour increase their majority on the council after gaining 1 seat to hold 61 of the 72 seats. Labour made the only gain in Tipton Green with the successful Labour candidate, Syeda Khatun, becoming the first Muslim woman to win a seat on Sandwell council. Tipton Green also saw the British National Party win 17.2% of the vote, the best result for the party in the West Midlands area. The Liberal Democrats held the 3 seats they had been defending to keep 9 councillors, with Victoria Handy becoming the youngest councillor at the age of 21 after holding Charlemont for the party. Meanwhile, the Conservatives held Wednesbury North, but failed to make any gains, to stay on just 2 seats. Overall turnout in the election was 23.6%, with Princes End ward seeing one of the lowest turnouts in the country.

Ward results

References

1999 English local elections
1999
1990s in the West Midlands (county)